Admiral Knight may refer to:

Austin M. Knight (1854–1927), U.S. Navy admiral
Charles Joseph Knight (born 1931), Royal Canadian Navy rear admiral
John Knight (Royal Navy officer) (1747–1831), British Royal Navy admiral

See also
Walter Knight-Adkin (1880–1957), Archdeacon of the Royal Navy